Dénommée, Denommée is a French surname. Notable people with the surname include: 

 Jayson Dénommée (born 1977), Canadian figure skater
 Laurie Denommée (born 2000), Canadian artistic gymnast

French-language surnames